Háifoss is a waterfall situated near the volcano Hekla in southern Iceland. The waterfall Granni is next to it. The river Fossá, a tributary of Þjórsá, drops here from a height of 122 m. This is the fourth highest waterfall of the island, after Morsárfoss, Glymur and Hengifoss.

From the historical farm Þjóðveldisbærinn Stöng,  which was destroyed by a volcanic eruption of Hekla in the Middle Ages and reconstructed, it is possible to hike to the waterfall along the Fossá (5 to 6 hours both directions). Above the waterfall, there is also a parking lot, to allow hiking to be done in the other direction.

See also
 Waterfalls of Iceland

References

External links

Photo

Waterfalls of Iceland